Julia Megan DeMato (born March 7, 1979) is an American professional cosmetologist and singer who made it to tenth place on the second season on the television show American Idol.

Early life
DeMato is the youngest of one sister and five brothers.  Her mother, Joan, is a realtor at RE/MAX in her home town and her father, Peter, owns Chase Equipment in New Milford.  She is a 1997 graduate of Brookfield High School.

American Idol
The buxom DeMato was heavily featured in coverage of the early rounds of American Idol, including the showing of drama with fellow singer Kimberly Caldwell during the "Hollywood" phase.  She sang Dusty Springfield's hit "Son of a Preacher Man" in the semi-finals.  In the finals, she sang  "Flashdance... What a Feeling" and "Where Did Our Love Go", before being voted off on March 26, 2003, after a rendition of Faith Hill's "Breathe".

After American Idol
After the show, she had some success on the American Idol concert tour, singing "Beautiful" by Christina Aguilera.  She also recorded a cover of "At Last" by Etta James on the American Idol 2 Love Songs CD.  DeMato's versions of these songs were well regarded by fans and reviewers.

However, her brief musical career peaked with the CD and the concert tour, and further success eluded her.  Later in 2003, she had a short stint as a judge for the Oxygen Network's show Meow TV.

She was unable to secure a recording contract with an established company, but did record one song, "Let It Rain", with a company called Somme Music - an Internet storefront marketing that one song.  Reaction to this song was mixed: some liked the vocals and also the music, while others had a problem with the composition and the negative tone of some of the lyrics (written by the head of Somme Music).  No further songs were recorded.

Living in her home town of Brookfield, and working once more as a cosmetologist, she has appeared as a singer on an occasional basis, mostly in Connecticut. Between July 22 and August 2, 2008, Julia and former Idol contestants Trenyce, RJ Helton, Frenchie Davis, and Rickey Smith performed at the Razz Room in San Francisco. Vonzell Solomon, Constantine Maroulis, and David Hernandez also appeared in the Razz Room from August 5–16.

On June 18, 2009, Julia DeMato began hosting a 12-week "Summer Idol" Karaoke event at Rowley's Tavern, a local Irish style pub located in Norwalk, Connecticut.  Julia starts off the evening singing a song, then offering color commentary and announcing upcoming singers. Other appearances in Connecticut include singing the National Anthem at the Thompson International Speedway at a NASCAR event.

On April 15, 2010, Demato and Idol alums Ace Young, Diana DeGarmo, Jorge Núñez, and RJ Helton lent a helping hand to hungry New Yorkers by delivering food with City Harvest.

Personal life
On July 6, 2005, she and her fiancé at the time, Jim Polches, became parents when she gave birth in Danbury, Connecticut.  She and Polches never wed.

In December, 2005, she made a brief return to the news when she was arrested and charged with possession of marijuana and cocaine, as well as driving while intoxicated after failing a field sobriety test.  At first, DeMato claimed it had all been a misunderstanding. While Connecticut has severe penalties against drunk driving, she was able to avoid a jail term and a criminal record by negotiating, through her lawyer, an alternative sentence involving community service and a program of drug and alcohol education.

External links 
Official MySpace
  Discussion group at Idolforums.com, going back to 2003, but mostly inactive these days.

References

1979 births
Living people
21st-century American singers
Cosmetics people
Singers from Connecticut
American Idol participants
People from Brookfield, Connecticut
21st-century American women singers